This is a list of the Belgium national football team's results from 1901 to the present day that, for various reasons, are not accorded the status of official internationals.

The nine games played between Belgium and England's amateur team are not considered as official by the opponents; this also applies to a game played between Belgium and England in 1946, which is classified by the English FA as an unofficial 'Victory International'. While the Belgian Football Association does not take several Olympic Games matches of Belgium into account, according to the RSSSF there is no reason to doubt about the official character.

1900 Summer Olympics 
The first appearance of a Belgium national team came at the 1900 Summer Olympics, where a mixed team representing Belgium mostly made up of students from the Université de Bruxelles, played one match against France represented by Club Français, which ended in a 2–6 loss.

1900s 
The earliest four games played by a national selection of players active in Belgium, with the Netherlands as opponent between 1901 and 1904, were not yet considered as official because of the presence of English players in the "Belgian" squad.

1910s 
Probably because of the war period (World War I), the results of matches between 1915 and 1918 are not shown in official overviews. The Dutch newspaper De Telegraaf, however, listed three France–Belgium matches in this period together with the matches between 1905 and 1914, without noting a difference in status. In the 1918 match Albert I, King of the Belgians, handed out a cup trophy for the winners. Also in this period, they faced Italy three times, two of which as a France-Belgium representative team.

1919 Inter-Allied Games
In the summer of 1919, Belgium participated in the Inter-Allied Games in Paris, on the occasion of the celebration of the Allied victory in World War I. This Belgian team featured five players who would go on to win the gold medal in the 1920 Summer Games in the following year. They comfortably beat Canada and the United States, which was the first time, official or otherwise, that Belgium faced a non-European team. However, a 1–4 loss to eventual champions Czechoslovakia on the opening day cost them a place in the final, although Belgium got their revenge by beating them in the final of the 1920 Olympics.

1920s 
Apart from the official biannual Low Countries derbies, Belgium played against the Netherlands for diverse purposes in the 1920s; the 1925 and 1926 matches served as fundraiser for FIFA and charity, respectively, and in the 1929 match the Royal Dutch Football Association's 40th anniversary was celebrated.

1930s 
Outside the official biannual Low Countries derbies, Belgium faced the Netherlands for diverse reasons in the 1930s; the 1930 match served to inaugurate the new national stadium, the two matches in 1932 served as fundraiser for FIFA and charity, and the 1939 match was at the occasion of the Royal Dutch Football Association's 50th anniversary.

1940s 
During the occupation of Belgium in World War II, Belgium played multiple unofficial friendlies abroad against teams of allied nations. These included two selections of the English FA that contained some Scottish and Welsh players at both occasions.

2010s 
The matches against Romania on 14 November 2012 and against Luxembourg on 26 May 2014 were scheduled as official friendlies but afterwards not recognized by FIFA because of Romania's 8 substitutions and Belgium's 7 substitutions respectively, while only 6 were allowed. The Belgian and Czech football federations were too late in asking that the match against Czech Republic on 5 June 2017 would be official.

References 

Belgium national football team matches
Unofficial
Lists of national association football team unofficial results